Sheffield Hillsborough was a Parliamentary constituency in the City of Sheffield. It was considered a safe Labour seat and was represented by Helen Jackson from 1992 to 2005.  She did not stand again in the 2005 general election and was succeeded by Angela Smith.

The Sheffield Hillsborough constituency was abolished at the 2010 General Election. It was divided up and incorporated into the Sheffield Brightside and Hillsborough, Sheffield Hallam and Penistone and Stocksbridge constituencies.

Boundaries
1918–1950: The County Borough of Sheffield wards of Hillsborough, Neepsend, and Walkley.

1950–1955: The County Borough of Sheffield wards of Crookesmoor, Hillsborough, Owlerton, and Walkley.

1955–1974: The County Borough of Sheffield wards of Cathedral, Hillsborough, Owlerton, and Walkley.

1974–1983: The County Borough of Sheffield wards of Hillsborough, Netherthorpe, Owlerton, and Walkley.

1983–2010: The City of Sheffield wards of Chapel Green, Hillsborough, South Wortley, Stocksbridge, and Walkley.

The constituency covered north west Sheffield. It was named for Hillsborough and reached north west to Stocksbridge.

Members of Parliament

Elections

Elections in the 2000s

Elections in the 1990s

Elections in the 1980s

Elections in the 1970s

Elections in the 1960s

Elections in the 1950s

Elections in the 1940s

Elections in the 1930s

Elections in the 1920s

Elections in the 1910s

See also 
 List of parliamentary constituencies in South Yorkshire

References

Sources
BBC Election 2005
BBC Vote 2001
Guardian Unlimited Politics (Election results from 1992 to the present)

http://www.psr.keele.ac.uk/  (Election results from 1951 to the present)
F. W. S. Craig, British Parliamentary Election Results 1918 - 1949
F. W. S. Craig, British Parliamentary Election Results 1950 - 1970
Sheffield General Election Results 1945 - 2001, Sheffield City Council

Hillsborough, South Yorkshire
Constituencies of the Parliament of the United Kingdom established in 1918
Constituencies of the Parliament of the United Kingdom disestablished in 2010
Hillsborough